Dominik Ťapaj (born 10 May 2004) is a Slovak professional footballer who plays for Ružomberok as a goalkeeper.

Club career

MFK Ružomberok
Ťapaj made his Fortuna Liga debut for Ružomberok against MFK Zemplín Michalovce at Štadión pod Čebraťom on 21 May 2022, he kept a clean sheet in the match.

References

External links
 MFK Ružomberok official profile 
 Futbalnet profile 
 
 

2004 births
Living people
Slovak footballers
Association football goalkeepers
MFK Ružomberok players
Slovak Super Liga players